Engineering Announcements for the Radio and Television Trade, sometimes abbreviated to Engineering Announcements, was a weekly magazine of news and information intended for technicians and salespeople in the United Kingdom, produced and transmitted by the Independent Television Authority (and later the Independent Broadcasting Authority) from 23 November 1970 until 31 July 1990, coming off air five months before the IBA was disbanded. The broadcast covered technical advances in the industry such as the launch of satellite television and NICAM stereo, along with details of new transmitters and the scheduling of transmitter downtime.

Engineering Announcements, and the BBC's similar Service Information, are examples of regularly scheduled "ghost programmes," so called because they were never advertised in on-air schedules, in newspaper TV listings, the TV Times or on teletext.

Scheduling
Engineering Announcements was originally scheduled directly after Monday's Newcomers, another ghost programme which offered the advertising trade the opportunity to watch first runs of new adverts before they aired in prime time on ITV. It was shown at 9:45a.m.

In September 1972, Engineering Announcements moved to 9:10a.m. on Tuesdays, where it remained until May 1983 as the launch of TV-am meant that the ITV network would no longer be available to show the programme although it was still shown on ITV for the two months following the launch of TV-am, in the 10-minute gap between the end of TV-am and the start of ITV - the gap was needed to allow for switching ITV from national transmission to the local ITV contractor. When this process became automated, the gap was no longer required. TV-am's hours were extended until 9:25a.m. and consequently the slot used to transmit Engineering Announcements disappeared.

At this point, the programme was switched to Channel 4 and S4C, with the first edition on the new channel being broadcast on 24 May 1983. It continued to be shown at the same time (Tuesdays at 9:15a.m.) with a repeat at 12:15 p.m. the same day, although the lunchtime repeat was not shown on S4C. However, as broadcasting hours increased, Engineering Announcements was forced into increasingly earlier time slots. The 12:15p.m. repeat was lost in September 1987 when ITV Schools was transferred to Channel 4/S4C. It moved to 8:10a.m. at the start of 1989 and when Channel 4 launched its breakfast television service in April 1989, Engineering Announcements was moved to 5:45a.m., where it could be recorded by engineers for later viewing. It remained in that early morning slot until the programme's final edition on 31 July 1990. Throughout its time on Channel 4, the theme tune to the programme was "Current Affairs" by Francis Monkman.

During the ITV strike from August to October 1979, Engineering Announcements was the only programme broadcast on most of the network.

References

External links
Engineering Information
Information on the final broadcast of Engineering Announcements

ITV (TV network)
Broadcasting in the United Kingdom
British non-fiction television series
British television news shows
1970 British television series debuts
1990 British television series endings
Radio in the United Kingdom
1970s British television series
1980s British television series